The Mystic Order of Veiled Prophets of the Enchanted Realm, also known as M.O.V.P.E.R. or The Grotto, after its lodge equivalent, is an appendant body in Freemasonry.

Overview

It is a social organization for Master Masons, and as such, all Master Masons are welcome to join. It encourages renewed interest in the Blue Lodges, though it makes no claim to be a part of Symbolic Craft Masonry.

Members are distinguished by a black fez with a red tassel and a Mokanna head in the middle.

History

The members Hamilton Lodge No. 120, Free and Accepted Masons, of Hamilton, NY, were planning a Royal Arch Degree that would be held under the auspices of Cyrus Chapter No. 50, Royal Arch Masons. The group found that they got along splendidly and continued to meet, even after the degree had been conferred. Soon, the men began playing friendly pranks on each other, which only heightened their fellowship. With this kind of jollity taking hold, it wasn’t long before other nearby Brothers wished to join the group which, by that time, had taken on the name of “The Fairchild Deviltry Committee,” in honor of the ringleader, Bro. Leroy Fairchild, who was a local merchant and business man.

From 1902 on, the Supreme Council would elect and transition power to officers on a yearly basis.

The name of the organization, as well as its principle female auxiliary were derived from Lalla-Rookh by Thomas Moore.

Female auxiliaries 

Sometime prior to 1917, the Mysterious Order Witches of Salem was founded as a female auxiliary to the Grotto. The first “Caldron,” the term used for a local chapter of the Mysterious Order Witches of Salem was founded in Chicago, IL, and was known as Aryan Caldron No. 1.

On January 15, 1918, Amoo Caldron No. 2 was constituted in Rock Island, IL. In 1918, the Supreme Caldron was formed, consisting of Aryan No. 1 and Amoo No. 2, with officers coming from both groups. Later, Koom Caldron No. 3 was opened in Rockford, IL.

On or about Wednesday, March 5, 1919, Amoo Caldron No. 2 seceded from the “Supreme Caldron,” which was mostly being operated out of Chicago. The ladies in Rock Island promptly declared themselves the new Supreme Caldron and Amoo Caldron became No. 1. On November 18, 1920, Mrs. Vashti H. Bollman, acting Supreme Enchantress of the "new" Supreme Caldron notes that Mrs. Josephine Mace, Mysterious Enchantress of Amoo No. 2, withdrew Amoo from the parent organization in Chicago. It is reported that she was brought up on fraternal charges, to which she pled guilty, surrendering the charter of Amoo No. 2 in the process. However, she refused to give up the name “Amoo Caldron” and used it to “usurp the name Supreme Caldron from the parent organization.”  The Amoo group began opening new Caldrons, getting up to at least five with the institution of Hapac Caldron No. 5 in 1920.

According to the history published by Omala Caldron on its website, the Daughters of Mokanna formed in 1919, in Rock Island, Illinois. This coincides with the secession of Amoo from Chicago and the founding of their own Supreme Caldron. They go one to describe how the ritual was decided upon and list the first four Daughters of Mokanna Caldrons – Amoo No. 1, Mohassan No. 2, Ankara, No. 3, and Zal No. 4. This would lead one to believe that Hapac was No. 5 as listed in the newspaper accounts. However, no account is given as to what happened to Koom Caldron No. 3, except that it shows up as participating in the Daughters of Mokanna national Convention in 1922.

Like its male counterpart, the group was involved in charitable activities directed toward cerebral palsy and dentistry for the handicapped. Membership in this auxiliary dropped dramatically in the late 20th century, from 8,000 members in the mid-1960s to 4,822 in 1994.

References

External links
Supreme Council, Grottoes of North America
Grotto Humanitarian Foundation
Source information

Masonic organizations
Organizations established in 1890